Ambient 4: Isolationism is a 1994 studio album of new material by various ambient artists released on the Virgin Records label, part of its Ambient series. The compilation was issued as a double CD, packaged in a slimline case.  It was compiled by and features liner notes by Kevin Martin. It was the first in the series to be composed entirely of new, exclusive material.

Background
The term "isolationism" was coined by British musician Kevin Martin and first appeared in print in a September 1993 issue of The Wire magazine. He described it as a form of fractured, subdued music that "pushed away" listeners.

James Plotkin identifies Brian Eno's ambient works as the greatest influence on the isolationist scene, along with American experimental music such as Illusion of Safety. 

As Plotkin says,

Track listing

CD 1
 KK Null & Jim Plotkin: "Lost (Held Under)"
 Jim O'Rourke: "Flat Without A Back"
 Ice: "The Dredger"
 Raoul Björkenheim: "Strangers"
 Zoviet France: "Daisy Gun"
 Labradford: "Air Lubricated Free Axis Trainer"
 Techno Animal: "Self Strangulation"
 Paul Schütze: "Hallucinations (In Memory Of Reinaldo Arenas)"
 Scorn: "Silver Rain Fell (Deep Water Mix)"
 Disco Inferno: "Lost In Fog"
 Total: "Six"
 Nijiumu: "Once Again I Cast Myself Into The Flames Of Atonement"

CD 2
 Aphex Twin: "Aphex Airlines"
 AMM: "Vandoevre"
 Seefeel: "Lief"
 .O.rang: "Little Sister"
 E.A.R.: "Hydroponic"
 Sufi: "Desert Flower"
 David Toop & Max Eastley: "Burial Rites (Phosphorescent Mix)"
 Main: "Crater Scar (Adrenochrome)"
 Final: "Hide"
 Lull: "Thoughts"
 Thomas Köner: "Kanon (Part One: Brohuk)"

References

1994 compilation albums
Virgin Records compilation albums
Ambient compilation albums